Region I (Spanish: Región 1. Valle de Bravo) is an intrastate region within the State of Mexico, one of 16.  It borders the states of Michoacán in the west corner of the state.  The region comprises thirteen municipalities: Amanalco, Otzoloapan, Valle de Bravo, Santo Tomás, Zacazonapan,.  It is largely rural.

Municipalities 
Amanalco
Ixtapan del Oro
Otzoloapan
Santo Tomás
Valle de Bravo
Zacazonapan

References

Regions of the State of Mexico